The Tabriz World Trade Center (Markaz-e Tejārat-e Jahāni), is the tallest structure in Tabriz, Iranian Azerbaijan. The building is a 37-storey building with a height of 192 m

See also
 List of tallest buildings in Iran
 List of World Trade Centers

References

External links 
 

Buildings and structures in Tabriz
Towers in Iran
Skyscraper office buildings in Iran
World Trade Centers
Economy of Iranian Azerbaijan
2017 establishments in Iran